Striking 12 is the music group GrooveLily's off-Broadway holiday musical, based in part on Hans Christian Andersen's 1845 story "The Little Match Girl".
The cast recording was released in 2004 by PS Classics.

Track listing 

 Violin Ascension
 Overture
 "Thank You Very Much And Welcome..."
 Snow Song (It's Coming Down)
 "Our Story Begins With A Man..."
 Last Day Of The Year
 Resolution
 "And So, The Man Resolves..."
 The Sales Pitch
 "But The Woman Is Gone..."
 "It Was Terribly Cold..."
 Matches For Sale
 Say What?
 "Lights Were Shining From Every Window..."
 Hey La La
 Fine, Fine, Fine
 "She Had Drawn Her Little Feet Under Her..."
 Can't Go Home
 "Her Little Hands Were Almost Frozen..."
 "The Burning Match Gave Off A Warm Bright Light..."
 Visions In The Matchlight
 "Someone Is Dying..."
 Give The Drummer Some Lovin' 
 "The Girl, When We Left Her..."
 Caution To The Wind
 Violin Ascension
 "The Grandmother Took The Little Girl"
 Screwed-Up People Make Great Art
 "Thank You For The Dissertation, Pal..."
 It's Not All Right
 "Excuse Me, Little Match Girl?..."
 Snow Song (Reprise)/First Day Of The Year
 Encore (The Little Drummer Boy)

External links
http://www.groovelily.com/

Off-Broadway musicals
Musicals based on works by Hans Christian Andersen
Works based on The Little Match Girl